A special election was held in  on December 15, 1800, to fill a vacancy left by the resignation of Samuel Lyman (F) on November 6, 1800.

Election results

Mattoon took his seat on February 2, 1801. Mattoon had also been elected to the same district for the 7th Congress.

See also
List of special elections to the United States House of Representatives

References

United States House of Representatives 1800 03
Massachusetts 03
Massachusetts 1800 03
1800 03
Massachusetts 03
United States House of Representatives 03